Wave 4 often designates the fourth batch release of a product line or series, such as:

Toys
 
 Releases of Chia Pet toys
 
 
 Releases of Mighty Muggs toys

Software

See also
 Waves4Power